Oscar Gelbfuhs (9 November 1852 in Šternberk, Moravia – 27 September 1877 in Cieszyn, Austrian Silesia) was a Moravian-Austrian chess master.

He took 11th in the Vienna 1873 chess tournament (Wilhelm Steinitz and Joseph Henry Blackburne won).
Gelbfuhs invented and proposed an auxiliary scoring method for tie breaking (Sonnenborn–Berger) there. A simpler version the "Neustadtl Score" later became widely used.

References 

1852 births
1877 deaths
People from Šternberk
Austrian chess players
Austrian people of Moravian-German descent
Moravian-German people
19th-century chess players
Austrian Jews